Kharaut is a large village and a gram panchayat in Nandgaon block of Chhata Tehsil of Mathura district in Uttar Pradesh. The village is about 4 kilometres from Kosi Kalan town and 3 km for from  NH19 Delhi Agra Highway nearby Kotwan Village and connect with Hasanpur Kosi Kalan Road.

References

External links

 

Villages in Mathura district